Eva Dichand (née Kriebernegg, born February 26, 1973) is an Austrian media manager, art collector, philanthropist and deputy chairwoman of the Albertina board of trustees, and managing director and publisher of the free daily newspaper Heute in Austria. Since 2012, she has owned the majority of the health portal Netdoktor, the largest medical online health portal, of which she is managing director.

Career 
After graduating from the HTL Matura in Graz, she studied at the University of Economics in Vienna and graduated with a dissertation on real estate offshore models in Eastern Europe. For two years she practiced as a consultant at Roland Berger. After working in the private equity area at CA, she was employed by Unternehmens Invest AG (UIAG) and supported projects for companies such as Andritz AG, Wolford, ETM professional control GmbH, Bene AG and Palfinger. She got into the newspaper business through her husband, “Krone” editor-in-chief and publisher Christoph Dichand. For two years she headed the now discontinued monthly magazine Our City. Since 2005 she has been managing director of the free daily newspaper Heute and from 2006 also publisher. Today brought out the weekend magazine “Live” in 2007, which was sold to Mediaprint shortly before it was discontinued in 2008 and no longer exists today. In 2015, she withdrew from the operational activities at Heute and spent a year with her husband and their three children in the USA to get to know the (especially digital) media landscape there and to intensify contacts in the field of contemporary art.

In 2016, Dichand sold the majority of the daily newspaper Heute (AHVV GmbH) to the listed Swiss group Tamedia.

Dichand was named Media Manager of the Year 2005 by the specialist magazine “Der Österreichische Journalist”. The 2007 ExtraDienst communicator ranking selected her as the winner among women. In 2010, the World Economic Forum chose Dr. Dichand as the only Austrian as a Young Global Leader (YGL). She is also involved in social and cultural institutions and is a member of Rotary. 

Since 2016, she has been a member of the International Council of the Metropolitan Museum, New York and the Musée d’Art Moderne de la Ville de Paris.

Since 2018, Dichand is Chair of the University Council of the Medical University of Vienna. For this she was nominated by the ÖVP. In addition, in 2020, ÖVP Minister Karoline Edtstadler was appointed deputy chairwoman of the board of trustees of the Albertina Museum in Vienna.

Family 
Dichand grew up as the daughter of an entrepreneur and a pharmacist in Graz. She is married to Christoph Dichand, the editor-in-chief and publisher of the Kronen Zeitung. Her father-in-law, Hans Dichand, was the founder and half-owner, editor-in-chief and publisher of the Kronen Zeitung until his death in June 2010. Eva Dichand lives with her husband and their three children, Constantin (born 2004), Arthur (born 2007) and Annabelle Gracia (born 2009) in Vienna and Paris.

References

Sources 
 Careernetwork medianet Freitag 18. Mai 2007 Seite 75
 Woman 19/2007, 14. September 2007, Karriere Medientage, Seite 95
 Der Standard 30. Jänner 2007
 Bestseller Magazin für Marketing, Werbung und Medien 9/2006 Seite 22
 Format Nr 7 17. Februar 2006
 Austrian Business Woman Nr 1, Dezember 2007 „Ladies mit Reichweite“
 Der Österreichische Journalist www.journalist.at 8+9/2007
 Extradienst ED12/ 21. Dezember 2007 Kommunikator 2007 www.mucha.at
 Format Nr 7 17. Februar 2006
 Der Österreichische Journalist www.journalist.at 8+9/2007
 Grazetta 1/2008
 https://www.pressreader.com/austria/heute-wien-ausgabe/20200130/281913070090302

1973 births
Living people
Austrian journalists
Businesspeople from Graz
Vienna University of Economics and Business alumni
21st-century Austrian women writers
Writers from Graz